The M14, officially referred to as the M14 Altunizade - Kazım Karabekir metro line is a 7.3 km long rapid transit line project on the Anatolian side of Istanbul, with Altunizade as the first station and Kâzım Karabekir as the last station.

When the project first came out, it was stated that the metro line would be built as a mini metro line between Kısıklı and Çamlıca Mosque, just like the M6 Levent - Boğaziçi University - Hisarüstü metro line. Though later on it was announced that the project got cancelled. After the Istanbul Metropolitan Municipality announced that this project was canceled, the Ministry of Transport and Infrastructure revised the project to be a standart metro line and undertook the construction of the project.

Stations

References 

Istanbul Metro
Transport infrastructure under construction in Turkey